Andrew Gordon Magrath (February 8, 1813 – April 9, 1893) was the last Governor of South Carolina under the Confederate States of America, a United States district judge of the United States District Court for the District of South Carolina and a Confederate District Judge for the District of South Carolina.

Education and career

Born on February 8, 1813, in Charleston, South Carolina, Magrath received an Artium Baccalaureus degree in 1831 from South Carolina College (now the University of South Carolina), attended Harvard Law School and read law with James L. Petigru in 1835. He entered private practice in Charleston from 1835 to 1839, in 1841, and from 1843 to 1856. He was a member of the South Carolina House of Representatives in 1840, and 1842. Magrath was a member of the Democratic Party.

Federal judicial service

Magrath was nominated by President Franklin Pierce on May 9, 1856, to a seat on the United States District Court for the District of South Carolina vacated by Judge Robert Budd Gilchrist. He was confirmed by the United States Senate on May 12, 1856, and received his commission the same day.

Magrath's service was notable for his strongly proslavery decisions. In the trial of William C. Corrie for his ownership of the slave vessel Wanderer in 1858, Magrath rewrote the law from the bench by announcing that bringing enslaved people from Africa was not a crime if they had been enslaved prior to their purchase.

His service terminated on November 7, 1860, due to his resignation.

Resignation address

In the political history of the United States, an event has happened of ominous import to fifteen slaveholding States. The State of which we are citizens has been always understood to have to have deliberately fixed its purpose whenever that event should happen. Feeling an assurance of what will be the action of the State, I consider it my duty, without delay, to prepare to obey its wishes. That preparation is made by the resignation of the office I have held. For the last time, I have, as a Judge of the United States, administered the laws of the United States, within the limits of the State of South Carolina. While thus acting in obedience to a sense of duty, I cannot be indifferent to the emotions it must produce. That department of Government which. I believe, has best maintained its integrity and preserved its purity, has been suspended. So far as I am concerned, the Temple of Justice, raised under the Constitution of the United States, is now closed. If it shall be never again opened, I thank God that its doors have been closed before its altar has been desecrated with sacrifices to tyranny.

Confederate service

Magrath was a member of South Carolina's succession convention in 1860, and was the first speaker at the signing ceremony. He was the Secretary of State of South Carolina from 1860 to 1861. He was a Judge of the Confederate District Court for the District of South Carolina from 1861 to 1864. He was elected on December 18, 1864, as the last Governor of South Carolina under the Confederate States of America, serving from December 20, 1864, to May 25, 1865, when he was deposed by the Union Army and imprisoned at Fort Pulaski. Magrath was the final governor to be elected by a secret ballot of the State Legislature, with gubernatorial selection being changed to popular election. He served a partial term until he was overthrown and imprisoned by the Union Army.

Later career and death

After his release from prison in December 1865, Magrath resumed private practice in Charleston from 1865 to 1893. He died on April 9, 1893, in Charleston. He was interred at Magnolia Cemetery in Charleston.

Notes

References

Sources

External links
 
 
 

1813 births
1893 deaths
University of South Carolina alumni
Harvard Law School alumni
South Carolina lawyers
Democratic Party members of the South Carolina House of Representatives
Judges of the United States District Court for the District of South Carolina
United States federal judges appointed by Franklin Pierce
19th-century American judges
People of South Carolina in the American Civil War
Democratic Party governors of South Carolina
Judges of the Confederate States of America
Confederate States of America state governors
19th-century American politicians
United States federal judges admitted to the practice of law by reading law
Burials at Magnolia Cemetery (Charleston, South Carolina)